Sébougou is a village and rural commune in the Cercle of Ségou in the Ségou Region of southern-central Mali. The commune contains 10 villages in an area of approximately 115 square kilometers. In the 2009 census it had a population of 16,175. The commune lies to the south of the River Niger and to the west of the urban commune of Ségou.

References

External links
.

Communes of Ségou Region